Gateway Nunatak is a prominent nunatak near the head of Mackay Glacier, standing  west of Mount Gran, in Victoria Land, Antarctica. It was surveyed in 1957 by the New Zealand Northern Survey Party of the Commonwealth Trans-Antarctic Expedition (1956–58), and so named by them because it marks the most obvious gateway through the upper icefalls for parties traveling west up the Mackay Glacier.

References

Nunataks of Victoria Land
Scott Coast